The history of the Jews in Uruguay dates back to the colonial empire. Perhaps the most important influx of Jewish population was during the 20th century, due to World War I and World War II.  Uruguay's Jewish community is mainly composed of Ashkenazi. Uruguay is home to the fifth largest Jewish community in Latin America after Argentina, Brazil, Mexico, and Chile respectively, and the largest as a proportion of the total population.

History
The arrival of Jews to the Banda Oriental goes back to the 16th century, when conversos began settling there. The Spanish Inquisition was not a significant force in the territory, and the first recorded Jewish settlement there was in the 1770s. When the Inquisition ended in 1813, it paved the way for Jews being more accepted in Uruguay throughout the 19th century.

Significant Jewish immigration began in the late 19th century, when Jews from neighboring Brazil and Argentina emigrated to Uruguay. Most of them were Sephardim, followed by Ashkenazim, Mizrahim, and Italkim. The largest Jewish population was in Montevideo, which had 150 Jews in 1909. The first recorded minyan in Uruguay happened in 1912, and the first synagogue was opened in 1917 by a small Ashkenazi community. Jewish schools were opened in the 1920s, and in 1929, the Ashkenazi community set up an educational network.

The majority of Jewish immigration to Uruguay took place in the 1920s and 1930s. A large percentage of Jewish immigrants during this period were German Jews and Italian Jews.

Uruguayan Jews initially made a living in small retail trade and peddling, with some becoming craftsmen and artisans. In time, they moved up the economic scale, and many became the owners of large stores or medium-sized businesses. Following World War II, Jews increased their representation in the professional world and became primarily middle-class, particularly as many Uruguayan Jews were by then second or third-generation Uruguayans. Their economic advancement was aided by the creation of Jewish loan and assistance funds, which evolved into Jewish banks. From the 1930s to 1950s, there were several failed attempts to establish a Jewish agricultural settlement.

During the establishment of Israel in 1948 and the subsequent 1948 Arab-Israeli War, which involved the mass exodus of Jews from Arab and Muslim countries, primarily to Israel, more than 18,000 Jews immigrated to Uruguay, primarily from the Arab world. In the 1950s, a number of Russian Jews and Hungarian Jews moved to Uruguay.

Uruguay, which had supported the creation of a Jewish homeland during the 1920 San Remo conference, was one of the first nations to recognize Israel, and the first Latin American country to do so. It was the first Latin American country and fourth country overall in which Israel established a diplomatic mission. It was also one of the few nations to support Jerusalem as the capital of Israel and oppose internationalization of the city. Its diplomatic mission in Jerusalem was upgraded to the status of an embassy in 1958, but subsequently downgraded to the status of consulate due to Arab pressure.

The Jewish community experienced a serious decline in the 1970s as a result of emigration. By the mid-1990s, there were no Jews in the upper echelons or military, and little Jewish representation in the legislature. The Latin American economic crisis of the 1990s and early 2000s affected the 40,000 Jews still in Uruguay. Between 1998 and 2003, many Uruguayan Jews emigrated to Israel.

Currently, 20,000-25,000 Jews live in Uruguay, with 95% residing in Montevideo. There is a small organized community in Paysandú, while other Jews are scattered throughout the country's interior. As of 2003, there were 20 synagogues, but only six of them held weekly Shabbat services, and one functioned every day.

Notable Uruguayan Jews
Past
 Zoma Baitler (1908-1994), artist and diplomat
 Monsieur Chouchani (died 1968), mysterious scholar
 Chil Rajchman (1914-2004), Holocaust survivor and entrepreneur
 Sergio Fogel dlocal co-founder 
 José Gurvich (1927-1974), painter
 Paul Armony (1932-2008), genealogist
 Carlos Sherman (1934-2005), writer
 Haim David Zukerwar (1956-2009), rabbi
 Ronald Melzer (1956-2013), public accountant and film critic
Present
 Mauricio Rosencof (born 1933), former guerrilla fighter,  playwright, poet and journalist
 George Davidsohn (born 1936), businessman, founder of Davidsohn Global Technologies
 Luis Camnitzer (born 1937), artist, art critic and writer
 Benjamín Nahum (born 1937), historian and academic
 Alberto Couriel (born 1935), public accountant and politician
 Teresa Porzecanski (born 1945), anthropologist and writer
 Hugo Fernández Faingold (born 1947), academic and politician, Vicepresident of the Republic (1998-2000)
 Ricardo Ehrlich (born 1948), engineer, Intendant of Montevideo (2005-2010)
 Gisele Ben-Dor (born 1955), conductor
 Roberto Kreimerman (born 1958), engineer and politician
 Sergio Gorzy (born 1958), sports journalist
 Isaac Alfie (born 1962), economist, Minister of Economy and Finance (2003-2005)
 Jorge Drexler (born 1964), singer/songwriter, Academy Award for Best Original Song 2004
 Alejandro Stock (born 1965), artist
 Suzie Navot, constitutional law scholar
 Freddy Nieuchowicz, aka Orlando Petinatti (born 1968), radio host
 Daniel Hendler (born 1976), actor
 Álvaro Brechner (born 1976), film director, writer and producer
 Marcelo Lipatín (born 1977), football player
 Gabe Saporta (born 1979), singer/songwriter/bassist
 Andy Ram (born 1980), retired professional tennis player
 Roni Kaplan (born 1982), military officer and spokesperson
 Marcel Felder (born 1984), tennis player, gold medal at the 2013 Maccabiah Games
 Camila Rajchman (born 1994), singer and television personality.

See also

List of synagogues in Uruguay
Israel-Uruguay relations
Holocaust Memorial, Montevideo
Uruguayan Jews in Israel
Barrio de los Judíos

References

External links

 
 Uruguay: Virtual Jewish History Tour - Jewish Virtual Library
 Uruguay - Jewish Agency for Israel